Oncidium flexuosum is a species of orchid found from eastern and southern Brazil to north-central Argentina.

References

External links 

flexuosum
Orchids of Argentina
Orchids of Brazil